Nur Mohammad Sheikh (26 February 1936 – 5 September 1971) was a Lance Nayek in East Pakistan Rifles during the Liberation War.
He was killed in an engagement with the Pakistan Army while providing covering fire for the extrication of fellow soldiers at Goalhati in Jessore district on 5 September 1971.  He was awarded Bir Sreshtho, Bangladesh's highest award for valor.

Early life
Sheikh was born on February 26, 1936, in Moheshkhali village Narail. His father was Mohammad Amanat Sheikh and his mother's name was Mosammat Jinnatunnesa Khanam. He lost his parents at an early age and continued his education up to seventh grade at local schools. As a child he loved theatre. Sheikh was married to Fazilatunnesa (d. 2018).

On 14 March 1959, Sheikh joined the East Pakistan Rifles. After finishing elementary training, he was appointed at the Dinajpur sector. He was transferred to Jessore sector on 1 July 1970. In March 1971, Sheikh was spending a vacation at his village. As the war started, he joined sector 8 and continued to take part at different battles at Jessore. He died on 5 September during the Goalhati Battle in Sutipur.

Battle of Goalhati and death
Lance Nayek Nur Mohammad was selected as the captain of the Standing Patrol team at Goalhati in Jessore's Chutipur Camp that was established to monitor the Pakistan army. On 5 September, Nur Mohammad was patrolling with 4 fellow soldiers. The Pakistan army attacked them from three different sides. Nur Mohammad tried to retreat to his base while still engaging the Pakistani troops. Meanwhile, one of his fellow soldiers, Nannu Mia, was injured after a bullet hit him. Nur Mohammad tried to carry Nannu Mia towards safety while trying to fire his gun from different places as a trick to confuse the Pakistani troops into believing that there were more than four Bangladeshi rebels. In doing so, Nur Mohammad himself was hit by a mortar and his foot was destroyed. Even though he was seriously injured, Nur Mohammad decided to continue to provide cover fire for his team to escape. At the time, his fellow Sepoy Mostafa urged Nur Mohammad to go with him. Mostafa even tried to force Nur Mohammad to go but Nur Mohammad refused to go and gave his light machine gun to Mostafa so that it would not be captured after his death. He kept a self loaded rifle with him and kept on fighting until he died.

Legacy
Bir Shreshtha Noor Mohammad Public College at Pilkhana has been named in his memory. He was buried  in Kashipur under Sharsha upazila of Jessore district. A hospital in Jessore is named after him.

References

1936 births
1971 deaths
Bangladeshi military personnel
People killed in the Bangladesh Liberation War
Recipients of the Bir Sreshtho
People from Narail District
Mukti Bahini personnel